Luis Trenker (born Alois Franz Trenker, 4 October 1892 – 12 April 1990) was a South Tyrolean film producer, director, writer, actor, architect, alpinist, and bobsledder.

Biography

Early life
Alois Franz Trenker was born on 4 October 1892 in Urtijëi, Tyrol in the Austro-Hungarian Empire (in present-day northern Italy). His father Jacob Trenker was a painter from North Tyrol, and his mother Karolina (née Demetz) was from Urtijëi in Val Gardena. He grew up speaking two languages: German, the language of his father, and Ladin, the language of his mother. He attended the local primary school from 1898 to 1901, and then attended the Josefinum in Bolzano in 1902 and 1903. From 1903 to 1905, he attended the arts and crafts school in Bolzano, where he developed his skills as a woodcarver.

In 1912, he entered the Realschule in Innsbruck, where he studied Italian as a foreign language. There he began his middle school studies. During his high school years, he spent his holidays working for mountain guides and ski instructors. After his matriculation examinations in 1912, Trenker studied architecture at the Technical University in Vienna.

World War I
At the start of World War I, Trenker fought as a cadet in an Austro-Hungarian heavy artillery unit on the Eastern Front in Galicia and Russisch-Polen. From 1915 to 1918, he fought in the mountain war against Italy in the border fortress of Nauders. Later he fought in Trento. From 1916 he served as a mountain guide in the Dolomites. At the end of the war he had achieved the rank of Lieutenant. He would write 23 books based on his war experiences, the most important of which were Fort Rocca Alta and Berge in Flammen, the latter of which was made into the 1931 film Mountains on Fire.

At the end of the war, Trenker made several unsuccessful attempts to start an architecture business in Bolzano. In 1924 he graduated from the Technical University of Graz, and then worked as an architect in Bolzano, forming a business partnership with the Austrian architect Clemens Holzmeister. In 1924, Trenker participated in the Winter Olympic Games in Chamonix as a member of the Italian five-man bobsled team. Under the leadership of Pilot Lodovico Obexer, they ended up in sixth place.

Film career
Trenker's first contact with film came in 1921, when he helped director Arnold Fanck on one of his mountain films. The main actor could not perform the stunts required, and so Trenker assumed the leading role. He gradually assumed more roles on the set, and by 1928 was directing, writing, and starring in his own films. By now he had abandoned his job as an architect to concentrate on his films.

In 1928 he married Hilda von Bleichert, the daughter of a fabrics manufacturer from Leipzig, and together they had four children. In 1932 Trenker created (with Curtis Bernhardt and Edwin H. Knopf) a historical film The Rebel. Trenker stated that the film's plotline of a Tyrolean mountaineer Severin Anderlan leading a revolt against occupying French forces in 1809, during the Napoleonic Wars. The greatest Tirolean patriot Andreas Hofer was a proto-type of "Severin Anderlan" ... Trenker was designed to mirror what was happening in contemporary Germany as it rejected the terms of the Treaty of Versailles.

The main theme of Trenker's work was the idealization of peoples connection with their homeland and pointing out the decadence of city life (most clearly visible in his 1934 film Der verlorene Sohn (The Prodigal Son). This loosely played into the hands of Nazi propagandists, who seized upon the nationalistic elements of his work. However, Trenker refused to allow his work to be subverted as such and eventually moved to Rome in 1940 to avoid further governmental pressure. After a pair of documentary films, however, Trenker returned to Bolzano and stopped making films. The style he had developed in the thirties was not limited to nationalistic, folkloristic, and heroic clichés. His impersonation of a hungry, downtrodden immigrant in depression era New York was regarded as one of the seminal scenes for future Italian neorealism by the likes of Roberto Rossellini.

After World War II
Trenker was accused of fascist opportunism after the war, but the charges were eventually dropped. In the 1950s, he returned to the movie industry, though by 1965 he was making primarily documentary films that focused on the Austrian province of Tyrol and South Tyrol (his homeland), which had become part of Italy. He also returned to writing about the mountains.

Later life
In 1988 Hilda Trenker von Bleichert died. Luis Trenker died on 13 April 1990 in Bolzano at the age 97. He was buried in his family's plot at Urtijëi. In 1992, for the centennial of his birth, his native town of Ortisei dedicated a monument that shows him in mountaineer garb while looking at the Langkofel, a mountain he liked to climb. In March 2004, the Museum Gherdëina displayed a collection of Trenker's belongings from a bequest of his family.

Filmography
 Mountain of Destiny (1924), Der Berg des Schicksals, 
 The Holy Mountain (1926), Der heilige Berg, 
 The Great Leap (1927), Der große Sprung, 
 Struggle for the Matterhorn (1928), Der Kampf ums Matterhorn, 
 The Call of the North (1929), Der Ruf des Nordens, 
 The Son of the White Mountain (1930), Der Sohn der weißen Berge, 
 The Great Longing (1930), Die große Sehnsucht, 
 Les Chevaliers de la montagne (1930), Knights of the Mountains, 
  (1930), 
 Mountains on Fire (1931), Berge in Flammen, 
 Doomed Battalion (1932), 
 The Rebel (1932), Der Rebell, 
 The Prodigal Son (1934), 
 Der Kaiser von Kalifornien (1936), 
 Giovanni de Medici: The Leader (1937), 
 Condottieri (1937), 
 The Mountain Calls (1938), Der Berg ruft, 
 The Challenge (1938), 
 Love Letters from Engadin (1938), Liebesbriefe aus dem Engadin, 
 Boundary Fire (1939), 
 Urlaub im Schnee (1939, short), 
 The Fire Devil (1940), 
 Der König der Berge (1940, short), 
 Pastor Angelicus (1942), 
  (1943), 
 Monte Miracolo (1945), 
 Barrier to the North (1950), Barriera a settentrione, Duell in den Bergen, 
 Aus König Laurins Rosengarten (1951), 
 Bergsommer (1952, short), 
 An der Dolomitenstraße (1952, short), 
  (1952, short), 
 Niemals mutlos (1952, short), Don't Surrender Never!, 
 Gondelfahrt durch Venedig (1952, short), Venetian Walk, 
 Lofotenfischer (1952, short), The Lofoten Fisher, 
 Die Sphinx von Zermatt (1953, short), 
 Kavaliere im Eis (1954, short), 
 Escape to the Dolomites (1955), 
 S.O.S. Zinnennordwand (1955, short), 
  (1956), 
  (1956), 
  (1957), 
 Unser Freund, der Haflinger (1957, short), Our Friend Haflinger, 
 Zwei Wege, ein Gipfel (1961, short), 
 His Best Friend (1962), His Best Friend, 
 Vacanze scambio (1962), 
 Luftsprünge (1969–70, television series), 
 Skifreuden in den Dolomiten (1970, short), 
 Ich filmte am Matterhorn (1970), 
 Olympia (1971), 
 Die Glückspirale (1971), 
 Heimat aus Gottes Hand (1979), 
 Hochkant (1982), 

Bibliography
 Meine Berge (1931), with Walter Schmidkunz
 Berge in Flammen. Ein Roman aus den Schicksalstagen Südtirols (1931), with Walter Schmidkunz
 Kameraden der Berge (1932)
 Der Rebell. Ein Freiheitsroman aus den Bergen Tirols (1933)
 Berge und Heimat: Das Buch von den Bergen und ihren Menschen (1933), with Walter Schmidkunz
 Der verlorene Sohn. Roman (1934)
 Berge im Schnee. Das Winterbuch (1935)
 Helden der Berge. Roman (1936), with Karl Springenschmid und Walter Schmidkunz
 Leuchtendes Land. Roman (1937), with Karl Springenschmid
 Sperrfort Rocca Alta. Der Heldenkampf eines Panzerwerkes (1937)
 Hauptmann Ladurner. Ein Soldatenroman (1940)
 Der Feuerteufel. Ein Speckbacherroman (1940)
 Sterne über den Gipfeln. Roman (1942)
 Heimat aus Gottes Hand. Roman (1948)
 Duell in den Bergen. Ein Roman aus den Dolomiten (1951)
 Glocken über den Bergen. Roman (1952)
 Sonne über Sorasass. Ein heiterer Roman aus den Dolomiten (1953)
 Schicksal am Matterhorn. Roman (1957)
 Helden am Berg. Roman (1956)
 Das Wunder von Oberammergau. Roman (1960)
 Sohn ohne Heimat. Roman (1960)
 Die Farm am Kilimandscharo (1960)
 Der Kaiser von Kalifornien. Roman (1961)
 Alles gut gegangen. Geschichten aus meinem Leben (1965, autobiography)

Honors and awards
 1936 Venice Film Festival Award for Best Foreign Film for Der Kaiser von Kalifornien 1966 Cross of Honor of the City of Vienna
 1966 Order of Merit of the Italian Republic
 1977 Order of Merit of the State of Tyrol
 1978 Karl Valentin Order of Merit
 1979 Bavarian Order of Merit
 1982 Deutscher Filmpreis for Outstanding Individual Contributions to German Cinema

Gallery

References

Further reading
 Birgel, Franz A. (2000). "Luis Trenker: A Rebel in the Third Reich?” In "Through a National Socialist Lens: Cinema in Nazi Germany." Ed. Robert Reimer and intro. David Bathrick. Rochester, NY: Camden House. Pages 37–64.
 Friehs, Julia, and Daniel Winkler, Marie-Noëlle Yazdanpanah (1955). "Südtirol-Trentino, Heimatfilm und Nachkriegskino" in Zibaldone. Zeitschrift für italienische Kultur der Gegenwart. Südtirol. Nr. 49/2010.
 Friehs, Julia, and Daniel Winkler, Marie-Noëlle Yazdanpanah. "Alpine Medienavantgarde? Luis Trenker, der John Wayne der Dolomiten" in Journal für Kulturstudien 21. S. 80–91.
 Gorter, Wolfgang (1977). Mein Freund Luis Trenker. Heering, Seebruck am Chiemsee. .
 König, Stefan, and Florian Trenker (2006). Bera Luis. Das Phänomen Luis Trenker. Eine Biographie. München: Berg und Tal. .
 Köpf, Gerhard (1994). Ezra und Luis oder die Erstbesteigung des Ulmer Münsters. Innsbruck.
 Kratochvíl, Antonín (1980). Abendgespräche mit Luis Trenker. München: Athos. .
 Leimgruber, Florian (1994). Luis Trenker, Regisseur und Schriftsteller. Bozen: Frasnelli-Keitsch. .
 Menzel, Roderich. (1982). Luis Trenker. Düsseldorf: Hoch. .
 Nottebohm, Rudolf, and Hans-Jürgen Panitz (1987). Fast ein Jahrhundert Luis Trenker. München: Herbig. .
 Panitz, Hans-Jürgen (2009). Luis Trenker – ungeschminkt. Bilder, Stationen, Begegnungen. Tyrolia und Athesia. .
 Thalhammer, Hans (1933). Luis Trenker, der Bergführer. Lilienfeld: Waldland.
 Waldner, Hansjörg (1990). Deutschland blickt auf uns Tiroler. Südtirol-Romane zwischen 1918 und 1945.'' Wien: Picus. .

External links

 
 
 Virtual History – Photographs
  Mountain Men (TCM Movie Morlocks on The Challenge)
 http://www.walter-riml.at/welcome/1927-gita-the-goat-girl/ Luis Trenker
 
 

1892 births
1990 deaths
People from Urtijëi
People from the County of Tyrol
Ladin people
Italian film directors
Italian male silent film actors
Germanophone Italian people
Austrian film directors
Austrian male silent film actors
German-language film directors
Italian people of Austrian descent
Mountaineering film directors
20th-century Italian male actors
20th-century Austrian male actors
Bobsledders at the 1924 Winter Olympics
Recipients of the Cross of the Order of Merit of the Federal Republic of Germany
Sportspeople from Südtirol